Tortricodes selma is a species of moth of the family Tortricidae. It is found in northern Turkey.

The wingspan is 17.5–21 mm for males and 21 mm for females. The forewings are shining brownish grey, while the hindwings are bright brownish grey.

References

Moths described in 1991
Cnephasiini
Endemic fauna of Turkey
Insects of Turkey